Surjit can mean

Surjit Hockey Stadium
Surjit Hockey Society
Surjit Memorial Hockey Tournament

Surjit is a common Punjabi name common to both Punjabi males and females.

People named Surjit include:

 Surjit Bindrakhia, a popular Punjabi singer of Bhangra music.
 Surjit Paatar, Punjabi poet
 Surjit Singh Randhawa, a former captain of the Indian field hockey team.
 Surjit Singh Barnala, an Indian politician, former Chief Minister of Punjab and current governor of the Tamil Nadu province.
 Surjit Kaur Barnala a Sikh politician from Punjab, India.
 Surjit Singh Sethi a Punjabi playwright, novelist, short story writer, lyricist, film maker and theatre personality.
 Surjit Singh Sandhawalia, a former Punjab governor and judge.
 Surjit Khan is a British record producer, musician and singer-songwriter
 Surjit Singh Rakhra, an Indian politician, and Minister for Rural Development and Panchayat in the present Punjab Government.
 Harkishan Singh Surjeet, an Indian politician, leader of the Communist Party of India (Marxist)